Andrew James Duggan (born 19 September 1967) is an English former professional footballer who played as a defender in the English Football League for Barnsley, Rochdale, Huddersfield Town and Hartlepool United. He was born in Bradford.

References

1967 births
Living people
Footballers from Bradford
Association football defenders
English footballers
Barnsley F.C. players
Rochdale A.F.C. players
Huddersfield Town A.F.C. players
Hartlepool United F.C. players
English Football League players